Don Donaho Williams (May 23, 1919 – August 11, 2001) was an American football guard who played for one season in the National Football League (NFL). After playing college football for Texas, he was drafted by the Philadelphia Eagles in the 10th round of the 1941 NFL Draft. His rights were transferred to the Pittsburgh Steelers due to the events later referred to as the Pennsylvania Polka, and he played for them in 1941. In 1942, he played for the Second Air Force.

1919 births
2001 deaths
People from Claude, Texas
Players of American football from Texas
American football guards
Pittsburgh Steelers players
United States Army Air Forces personnel of World War II